Pinkwash is an American punk rock band formed in 2014 in Philadelphia, Pennsylvania, United States. After releasing 2 EPs on Sister Polygon Records they released their debut album on Don Giovanni Records in 2016.

Discography

Albums

EPs

References

External links
 Don Giovanni Records Official Website

Musical groups established in 2014
Don Giovanni Records artists
2014 establishments in Pennsylvania